Matej Mugerli (born 17 June 1981 in Nova Gorica) is a Slovenian former professional road bicycle racer, who rode professionally between 2005 and 2008, and from 2011 to 2020 for the , , ,  and  teams. He now works as a directeur sportif for UCI Continental team .

Major results

1998
 5th Road race, UCI Junior Road World Championships
2001
 5th GP Kranj
2003
 2nd GP Kranj
 5th Road race, UCI Under-23 Road World Championships
 6th Trofeo Gianfranco Bianchin
 8th Giro del Belvedere
2004
 1st Overall Giro del Friuli-Venezia Giulia
 1st Gran Premio Industrie del Marmo
 Volta do Rio de Janeiro
1st Mountains classification
1st Stages 3 & 4
 2nd Trofeo Città di San Vendemiano
2005
 4th Gran Premio di Chiasso
 9th Tour du Haut Var
 9th Classic Haribo
 10th Gran Premio di Lugano
2006
 1st Stage 6 Volta a Catalunya
2007
 2nd GP Kranj
2010
 1st Zagreb–Ljubljana
 2nd Overall Tour de Serbie
1st Stage 5
2011
 4th Overall Tour of China
1st Stage 8
 4th Overall Tour of Qinghai Lake
 5th Raiffeisen Grand Prix
 7th Ljubljana–Zagreb
 9th Tour of Vojvodina I
 10th Poreč Trophy
2012
 1st Poreč Trophy
 1st Banja Luka–Beograd II
 2nd Ljubljana–Zagreb
 4th Giro di Toscana
 6th Overall Course de la Solidarité Olympique
 8th Tour of Vojvodina II
 10th Gran Premio di Lugano
 10th Tour of Vojvodina I
2013
 1st  Overall Istrian Spring Trophy
1st Stage 1
 1st Poreč Trophy
 1st Banja Luka–Beograd II
 1st Classic Beograd–Čačak
 National Road Championships
2nd Road race
2nd Time trial
 2nd Grand Prix Südkärnten
 3rd Banja Luka–Beograd I
 4th GP Sencur
 4th Giro di Toscana
 6th Croatia–Slovenia
 7th Trofeo Laigueglia
 7th Central European Tour Budapest GP
 8th Raiffeisen Grand Prix
2014
 1st  Road race, National Road Championships
 1st Trofej Umag
 1st Gran Premio Industrie del Marmo
 2nd Grand Prix Südkärnten
 3rd Poreč Trophy
 4th Overall Circuit des Ardennes
 4th GP Izola
 4th Central European Tour Ibrány GP
 5th Overall Okolo Slovenska
 5th Giro del Medio Brenta
 8th Overall Istrian Spring Trophy
 8th Gran Premio di Lugano
 9th Raiffeisen Grand Prix
 10th Overall Tour d'Azerbaïdjan
2015
 2nd Odessa Grand Prix I
 2nd Odessa Grand Prix II
 3rd Overall Tour d'Azerbaïdjan
 5th Belgrade–Banja Luka I
 6th Overall Tour de Bretagne
1st Stage 2
 7th Tour of Almaty
 9th Overall Tour of Qinghai Lake
2016
 1st  Overall Tour de Serbie
1st Stage 3
 1st Poreč Trophy
 1st Stage 3 Tour d'Azerbaïdjan
 2nd Overall Tour of Qinghai Lake
 3rd Overall Istrian Spring Trophy
1st Stage 3
 3rd Overall Tour of Szeklerland
1st  Points classification
1st Stage 3b
2017
 1st Overall Istrian Spring Trophy
1st Stage 2
 1st Poreč Trophy
 1st GP Kranj
 1st Stage 3 Tour d'Azerbaïdjan
 1st Stage 3 Okolo Slovenska
 3rd GP Izola

References

External links

Profile on Liquigas official website

Living people
1981 births
Slovenian male cyclists
People from Nova Gorica
European Games competitors for Slovenia
Cyclists at the 2015 European Games